Divaplon (RU-32698) is a nonbenzodiazepine, anxiolytic and anticonvulsant drug from the pyrazolopyrimidine family of drugs. It acts as a partial agonist at the "benzodiazepine site" of the GABAA receptor in the brain.

References 

Anxiolytics
Aromatic ketones
Ethers
Imidazopyrimidines
GABAA receptor positive allosteric modulators